Marco Polo Junior Versus the Red Dragon (also known as Marco Polo Junior or The Red Red Dragon in the United States) is a 1972 Australian animated musical adventure film directed by Eric Porter, written by Sheldon Moldoff, and was the country's first animated feature film.

The two sequence directors were Porter's animation director Cam Ford (who had previously worked on the Beatles' Yellow Submarine) and Peter Gardiner. The film was later re-edited and combined with new sequences to become Marco Polo: Return to Xanadu in 2001.

Plot
Young Marco, a descendant of Marco Polo, and his companion Sandy the Seagull set off on a journey to the mythical kingdom of Xanadu, to help Princess Shining Moon defeat the evil magician the Red Dragon.

1972 voice cast
Bobby Rydell as Marco Polo Junior
Arnold Stang as the Delicate Dinosaur
Corie Sims as Princess Shining Moon
Kevin Golsby as the Red Dragon
Larry Best as the Guru
Gordon Hammet
Lionel G. Wilson
Arthur Anderson
Merril E. Joels
Sam Gray

Marco Polo: Return to Xanadu voice cast 

Nicholas Gonzales as Marco Polo Junior
Tony Pope as Foo-Ling, Babu, and Reginald the Seagull
 Elea Bartling as Princess Ming Yu and Maiden on Pirate Ship
 John Matthew as the Delicate Dinosaur and Marco Polo the Explorer
John C. Hyke as Malgor the Vulture and Sailing Ship Captain
Michael Kostroff as Kubla Khan and Lo Fat
 Paul Ainsley as Wong Wei
Robert Kramer as Helmsman, Voice of the Flame, and Grandpa
 Alan Altshuld as Pangu, Mr. Giovanni, and Marriage Priest
 Tim Bryon Owen as Space Station Captain, First Mate, and Kubla Khan's Servant
 Tony Pope, Robert Kramer, Cheddy Hart, John C. Hyke, and Chris Holter as Additional Voices

Production
The film was conceived by Sheldon Moldoff, who made the film as a co-production with Eric Porter in Australia. $60,000 of the budget was provided by the Australian Film Development Corporation. Preliminary story board work was done in the U.S., but most of the film was done in Australia.

Over 70 artists were involved in the film.  Sequence directors were Cam Ford and Peter Gardner, and animators were Paul McAdam, Yvonne Pearsall, Dick Dunne, Gairdon Cooke, Richard Jones, Gerry Grabner, Stan Walker, Cynthia Leech, Peter Luschwitz, Kevin Roper and children's illustrator Kilmeny Niland. Background work was by Graham Liney and Yvonne Perrin, sister of Disney's Sleeping Beauty background stylist Eyvind Earle. Production took place from mid 1970 until May 1972.

Only one voice, that of the Red Dragon, was provided by an Australian; actor and comedian Kevin Golsby.

Release
Shortly before the film's release in December 1972, an Australian/American cartoon special about the original Marco Polo screened on Australian television, prompting the film's distributors to make the title longer to avoid confusion. However, commercial results were poor, largely due to insufficient promotion by the U.S. distributors, although it did reasonably well in Australia and Europe. The low returns from the film persuaded Porter to undertake sub-contracted TV series work from America's Hanna-Barbera (The Amazing Chan and the Chan Clan, Super Friends, plus several one-off animated TV specials), but a subsequent financial recession in 1975 finally saw Porter shutting down his animation studio.

Three books were published using art work from the film.

The film's title was changed to The Magic Medallion for its 1976 release on television.

The movie had its widest American exposure over the HBO and Showtime premium cable networks in 1983 and 1984 respectively, and later the film got an extremely hard-to-find VHS from Family Home Entertainment. The movie was later included on BCI Eclipse's Advantage Collection DVD set.

In 2015, the National Film and Sound Archive of Australia released a restored print of the movie on DVD to celebrate the centenary of Australian animation.

Marco Polo: Return to Xanadu
Many years later, the story was re-edited and extended by scriptwriter (and original co-producer) Sheldon Moldoff, in collaboration with Ron Merk and, with additional footage, certain name changes like the Red Dragon to Foo-Ling, and added subplots, was released as Marco Polo: Return to Xanadu (2002) by Tooniversal Company. Lightyear Video and Warner Home Video handled the VHS/DVD release. The resulting version is generally considered to be vastly inferior to the original. Lionsgate Films has made this version of the movie available for video-on-demand.

References

External links

Marco Polo Junior Versus the Red Dragon at Oz Movies

1972 films
1972 animated films
Australian animated feature films
1970s Australian animated films
1970s English-language films